{{Infobox song
| name       = Cascade
| cover      = Fsol_cascade_cover.jpg
| alt        =
| type       = single
| artist     = Future Sound of London
| album      = Lifeforms
| released   = 25 October 1993
| recorded   = Earthbeat Studios
| studio     =
| venue      =
| genre      = Ambient techno
| length     = 36:31
| label      = AstralwerksCat.
| writer     = FSOL
| producer   = FSOL
| prev_title = Liquid Insects
| prev_year  = 1993
| next_title = Lifeforms
| next_year  = 1993
}}

"Cascade" is the first single from Future Sound of London's 1994 album Lifeforms. It is a series of variations on the song "Cascade", all different from the album's version as is customary for most FSOL singles. Garry Cobain said that the band "saw it as a great opportunity to write another album, but based around one song."

Track listing
 "Cascade: Part 1" (7:22)
 "Cascade: Part 2" (9:38)
 "Cascade: Part 3" (4:24)
 "Cascade: Part 4" (4:39)
 "Cascade: Part 5" (6:12)
 "Cascade: Shortform" (4:16)

Crew
Written, produced, performed by FSOL
Artwork by Buggy G. Riphead.
The first sleeve to feature The Electronic Brain, the model by Olaf Wendt.
Part 3 is essentially an extended version of "Elaborate Burn", another song on Lifeforms''.

Chart Position

Cascade 2020
In September 2020 FSOL released "Cascade 2020", an album that is a reimagination of the "Cascade" single from 1993. It includes recreations of "Cascade: Part 1" and "Cascade: Part 4", as well as two new parts of the piece (sixth and seventh) and nine other new tracks that are separately titled.

The result was described as "a sprawl of gloopy acid downbeats, spine-tracing trance arps, intergalactic steppers techno ballistics and a ravishing jungle mix, reconnecting strands of arcane prog rock into dub and computer music".

References

External links
 

1993 songs
1994 singles
The Future Sound of London songs
Astralwerks singles